Lars Erik Lindgren (born 10 November 1957) is a Swedish curler, a  and three-time Swedish men's champion (1976, 1980, 1989).

His team won the 1976 Sweden men's championship, but it was decided that the team members were too young for the World Championship, so team Bengt Cederwall (skip) went to the  instead.

Teams

References

External links
 

Living people
1957 births
Swedish male curlers
Swedish curling champions
21st-century Swedish people